Judgement X Day or Judgement Day is a Metal hardcore straight-edge band from Southern California.

History
Judgement X Day formed in 2013. The band's lineup at the time was Vocalist Levi Lehman, Guitarists Michael and Brandon de Vincenzo, Bassist Travis Phillips and Drummer Joe Nunn. The band released a demo in November of that year, months after they formed. The demo featured Tommy Green, of bands such as Sleeping Giant and xDeathstarx. In June 2014, the band signed to OnTheAttack Records, a Christian hardcore label from San Francisco. The band released an EP titled The Altar in 2015 through OTA. The EP featured guest vocalists Chad Paramore of Messengers, Noah Friend of World of Pain, and Brandan Schieppati of Bleeding Through. The band is also signed to Made in the USA Records, owned by Levi Lehman the band's vocalist.

Members
Current
 Levi Lehman - Vocals
 Brandon De Vincenzo - Guitars
 Estaban Baena - Guitars
 Jake Kelley - Guitars
 Travis Phillips - Bass
 Joe Nunn - Drums

Former
 Michael - Guitars

Discography
Demos
 Judgement Day (2013)

Splits
 Judgment Day X Strength (2014; w/ Strength)

EPs
 The Altar (2016)
 The Sun. The Darkness. (2020)

References

Musical groups established in 2013
Christian hardcore musical groups
Hardcore punk groups from California
OnTheAttack Records artists
2013 establishments in California